Gerrardanthus is a genus of flowering plants native to tropical Africa and South Africa, first described by William Henry Harvey (1811–1866), and named in honor of William Tyrer Gerrard (died 1866 in Mahavelona, Madagascar), botanical collector in Natal and Madagascar in the 1860s.

Gerrardanthus is a perennial climber, with height up to 5 m, rising from a swollen, tuberous base with a thickness of up to 1.5 m. Stems are herbaceous but becoming woody and grey-barked as they age.

Species 
 Gerrardanthus aethiopicus
 Gerrardanthus grandiflorus
 Gerrardanthus lobatus
 Gerrardanthus macrorhizus
 Gerrardanthus nigericus
 Gerrardanthus paniculatus
 Gerrardanthus parviflorus
 Gerrardanthus portentosus
 Gerrardanthus tomentosus
 Gerrardanthus trimenii
 Gerrardanthus zenkeri

References 

 Aluka entry
 Taxonomicon entry
 Cucurbit entry
 ZipcodeZoo entry
 Takhtajan, A., Diversity and Classification of Flowering Plants, Columbia University Press : New York, 1997.

Cucurbitaceae genera
Cucurbitaceae
Taxa named by Joseph Dalton Hooker